The 2022–23 season is Bangkok United Football Club's 14th in the new era since they took over from Bangkok University Football Club in 2009. It is the 7th season in the Thai League and the club's 12th (9th consecutive) season in the top flight of the Thai football league system since returning in the 2013 season.

Squad

Transfer

Pre-season transfer

In 

MAHMOUD K. M. DAHADHA KHITAM 

WILLEN MOTA INACIO

Pawaris Tinres

Out

Return from loan

Competitions

Overview

Thai League

League table

Results overview

Matches

FA Cup

League Cup

Statistics

Appearances and goals

|-
|-
! colspan="16" style="background:#dcdcdc; text-align:center"| Players transferred/loaned out during the season

Top scorers

Clean sheets

Disciplinary record

Notes

References

BKU
Bangkok United F.C. seasons
BKU